Pinell de Solsonès is a municipality in the province of Lleida and autonomous community of Catalonia, Spain. The villages of Madrona, Miravé, Pinell, Sallent, and Sant Climenç are located in this municipality.

References

External links
 Government data pages 

Municipalities in Solsonès